Eau is a trigraph of the Latin script.

French
In Modern French,  is pronounced  and may or may not be the same phoneme as the one attached to the letter o.

It is used as an ending for several words, like berceau (cradle) or manteau (coat), usually being the remnant of a suffix (bercer meaning to cradle; mante meaning mantle). This is also a word by itself: eau means water.

English
In English,  only exists in words imported from French, and so is pronounced likewise in almost all cases. Exceptions include beauty and words derived from it, where it is pronounced , bureaucrat where it is pronounced , bureaucracy where it is pronounced , and (in some contexts) the proper names Beaulieu and Beauchamp.

Latin-script trigraphs